María Clara, whose full name is María Clara de los Santos y Alba, is the mestiza heroine in Noli Me Tángere, a novel by José Rizal, the national hero of the Philippines. Her name and character have since become a byword in Filipino culture for the traditional, feminine ideal.

María Clara is the childhood sweetheart and fiancée of Noli Me Tángeres main protagonist, Juan Crisóstomo Ibarra y Magsalin, the son of Don Rafael Ibarra. Although raised as the daughter of Santiago "Kapitán Tiago" de los Santos and his wife Doña Pía Alba, who are both native Filipinos, María Clara is revealed to have been the illegitimate daughter of Padre Dámaso, a Spanish Franciscan friar, who coerced Doña Pía into illicit sexual relations.

Dámaso is made the girl's godfather; Doña Pía had died giving birth to María Clara. Kapitán Tiago's cousin, Isabel, came to be the dominant maternal figure in her life. As her beau Crisóstomo Ibarra was studying in Europe, Kapitan Tiago sent María Clara to the Colegio de Santa Catalina de Sena, a convent school where she cultivated femininity under religion. Later in the novel, María Clara discovers the truth that Dámaso is her biological father.

Description
In the novel, María Clara is regarded as the most beautiful and celebrated lady in the town of San Diego. A devout Roman Catholic, she became the epitome of virtue; "demure and self-effacing" and endowed with beauty, grace and charm, she was promoted by Rizal as the "ideal image" of a Filipino woman who deserves to be placed on the "pedestal of male honour". In Chapter 5, María Clara and her traits were further described by Rizal as an "Oriental decoration" with "downcast" eyes and a "pure soul".

Characterization

Physical appearance
Because of her parentage, María Clara had Eurasian features, described by Rizal thus:"María Clara did not have the small eyes of her father: like her mother she had them large and black, beneath long lashes; gay and smiling when she played, sad and soulful and pensive when she was not laughing. Since childhood her hair had an almost golden hue; her nose, of a correct profile, was neither sharp nor flat; her mouth reminded one of her mother's, small and perfect, with two beautiful dimples on her cheeks. Her skin had the fine texture of an onion layer, the whiteness of cotton, according to her enthusiastic relatives. They saw traces of Capitan Tiago's paternity in the small and well-rounded ears of María Clara."

Personality
María Clara had been described in her childhood as everybody's idol, growing up among smiles and loves. Although Noli only touches upon her briefly in chapters, she is depicted as playful, exchanging wit and bantering with Ibarra, as well as expressing jealous possession when talking about him to her friends.

She is also very kind and considerate, and notices people whom others don't; she was the only person who noticed Elías during the fishing excursion and offered him biscuits. During the eve of the feast of San Diego, she also approached and offered her locket to a leper, despite her friends' warnings and shows of disgust.

During the latter half of the novel, she was often sickly and subdued. Having been separated from Ibarra, and hearing the news of his excommunication, she took ill, and eventually was blackmailed by Padre Salvi into distancing herself from Ibarra. She was also coerced into giving up Ibarra's love letters, which were ultimately used to implicate him.

In spite of her broken engagement with Ibarra, and subsequent engagement to Linares, she remained fiercely devoted to Ibarra. Upon hearing the news of his death, she told Padre Dámaso:"While he was alive, I was thinking on keeping on: I was hoping, I was trusting! I wanted to live to be able to hear about him... but now that they have killed him, there is no longer a reason for me to live and suffer... While he was alive, I could get married... I thought of flight afterwards... my father does not want anything but the connections! Now that he is dead nobody else shall claim me as his wife... When he was alive, I could degrade myself, there was left the comfort of knowing he lived and perhaps would think of me. Now that he is dead... the convent for me or the grave!"This ultimatum caused Padre Dámaso to relent and permit his daughter's entry into the Royal Monastery of Saint Clare (that until 1945 stood in Intramuros).

Basis and legacy
Rizal based the fictional character of María Clara on his real-life girlfriend and cousin, Leonor Rivera. Although praised and idolized, María Clara's chaste, "masochistic" and "easily fainting" character has also been denounced as the "greatest misfortune that has befallen the Filipina in the last one hundred years". Scholars have also denounced the insinuated culture of María Clara, notably that of Filipinas being submissive and quiet towards men – a stereotype that was first brought by the Spanish colonialists. Historians have pointed out that Filipinas have historically been more vocal and have served positions equal to, and some even higher than, men.

In Filipino fashion, María Clara's name has become the eponym for a multi-piece ensemble known as the María Clara gown, emulating the character's traits of being delicate, feminine, self-assured, and with a sense of identity.

Creation of the feminine ideal
Catholicism during the colonial ruling of the Philippines influenced the creation of a new feminine ideal of Filipina women. María Clara as a colonial figure became the ideal Filipina woman as she embodied the qualities of the Virgin archetype, mainly purity, chastity and sacrifice. Along with the impossible standard that María Clara upholds, the effects of Catholicism have led to taboos against the expression and discussion of female sexuality.

María Clara's song by José Rizal (in English)
Sweet the hours in the native country,
where friendly shines the sun above!
Life is the breeze that sweeps the meadows;
tranquil is death; most tender, love.

Warm kisses on the lips are playing
as we awake to mother's face:
the arms are seeking to embrace her,
the eyes are smiling as they gaze.

How sweet to die for the native country,
where friendly shines the sun above!
Death is the breeze for him who has
no country, no mother, and no love!

In popular culture

Maria Clara has been portrayed in several films and television series:
 Edita Vidal in the film Noli Me Tángere (1961)
 Maria Jose Arnaldo in the ABC television series Noli Me Tángere (1992)
 Monique Wilson in the film José Rizal (1998), and various Musical Plays
 Julie Anne San Jose in the GMA television series Maria Clara at Ibarra (2022-2023)

See also
Cult of domesticity
English rose (epithet)
Girl next door
Ideal womanhood

References

External links
Description of María Clara at en.wikibooks.org
Full text in Tagalog ("Ang Awit ni Maria Clara")
Full text in Spanish ("Canto de Maria")
Full text in English ("The Song of Maria Clara")

Fictional Filipino people
Noli Me Tangere (novel) characters
Philippine literature
Literary characters introduced in 1887